Robert, Bob or Bobby McCartney may refer to:

 Bob McCartney  1890s, Scottish footballer with Leith Athletic and Heart of Midlothian 
 Robert McCartney (Australian politician) (1906–?)
 Robert McCartney (Northern Irish politician) (born 1936), Northern Irish unionist politician
 Robert McCartney (murder victim) (1971–2005), victim of a 2005 murder in Northern Ireland